Jon Jensen Kolding (Latin:  Jonas Coldingensis) (d. 1609) was a Danish priest, historian and topographer. His most notable work was      Daniæ descriptio nova.

Biography
Jon Jensen Kolding was born near Kolding, Denmark and was educated in the Diocese of Ribe. 
In 1566 he became rector of Kolding. 
He entered the priesthood in 1573. He was assigned to Andst Church (Andst Kirke) in the parish at Store Andst in Vejen. In coordination with Caspar Markdanner (1533-1618) lensman at Koldinghus, he had Andst Church equipped with a tower with an onion-shaped lantern spire.

Jon Jensen Kolding wrote a number of works which were published in Latin under the name  Jonas Coldingensis. 
He wrote the topographical work Daniæ descriptio nova which was printed at Frankfurt in 1549.  In 1584 he published  Coronarium. Brevem descriptionem Daniæ and in 1594 En ny Danmarksbeskrivelse both providing descriptions of the Realm of Denmark. He received a Magister degree in 1591.

References  

1609 deaths
Year of birth unknown
16th-century Danish historians
17th-century Danish historians
People from Kolding Municipality
17th-century Danish clergy
Topographers